Ian David Patrick Macpherson, 3rd Baron Strathcarron (born 31 March 1949), is a British hereditary peer and member of House of Lords. He is also the baronet Sir Ian David Patrick Macpherson of Drumalban. He inherited the titles on the death of his father David Macpherson, 2nd Baron Strathcarron, on 31 August 2006.

Education 
Lord Strathcarron's early education was at Hill House School, before attending Horris Hill and then Eton College; after Eton, he went to Grenoble University.

Personal life 
Lord Strathcarron married the former Gillian Rosamund Allison (born 15 September 1946) in 1974 and they have two children, the Honourable Sophie Ananda Macpherson (born 14 April 1978) and the Honourable Rory David Alisdair Macpherson (born: 15 April 1982).

Career 
Lord Strathcarron spent ten years in the Orient working for Time-Life as a freelance journalist and copywriter. In 1970, he founded the Japan Europa Press Agency in Tokyo and sold it in 1995.

He became a partner in Strathcarron & Company in 1974, and a founder and Director of Global Alliance Automotive Ltd, a transnational version of Strathcarron & Company in 1993. In 1995, he founded Strathcarron Sports Cars plc, manufacturers of sports/racing cars and since 2006 he has been a trustee and director of the National Motor Museum in Beaulieu, Hampshire.

He is chairman and commissioning editor of Unicorn Publishing Group LLP, a visual arts, cultural history and digital publishing and media distribution company, Chairman of Sophie Macpherson Ltd, a fine arts recruitment and consultancy company, and Chairman of Play Associates Ltd., an interior design company, and a director of Art World Alliance Ltd., a grouping of UK art industry companies. In 2018, he founded the transmedia production company Affable Media Ltd.

In February 2022, he was elected to replace Viscount Ridley in the House of Lords following Ridley's retirement in December 2021. He took the oath on 21 February 2022.

Media works 
Lord Strathcarron is a student of Advaita Vedanta and has written of his experiences in non-duality in the books Living with Life and Mysticism and Bliss. He is also the author of two spy thriller novels for Troubador: Invisibility, and Black Beach.

In 2009, he recreated Lord Byron's 1809–1811 Grand Tour of the Mediterranean for the book Joy Unconfined! Lord Byron's Grand Tour Re-Toured published by Signal Books, an imprint of Christopher Hurst.

In 2010, he completed the first part of a Mark Twain travel trilogy based on Twain's 1867 tour of the Holy Land, resulting in the book Innocence & War: Mark Twain's Holy Land Revisited published in 2012 in the US by Dover Publications and in the UK by Signal Books. The second part of the trilogy, recreating Mark Twain's 1896 lecture tour of India for the book The Indian Equator; Mark Twain's India Revisited published in 2014 in the US by Dover Publications and in the UK by Signal Books. The final part of the trilogy, Heart of Lightness, Mark Twain's Mississippi Revisited, will be about Mark Twain's final steamboat journey up the Mississippi River from New Orleans to Hannibal, Missouri and his subsequent short career in the American Civil War.

In 2016, Unicorn Press published his biography of Sir Francis Chichester, Never Fear: Reliving the Life of Sir Francis Chichester.

In 2017, Unicorn Press published his art book about the painter Sophie Walbeoffe, Painting with Both Hands.

In 2018, Affable Media published his fictional biography, Crikey! How Did That Happen? The Refreshingly Unauthorised Biography of Sir Bertram Wooster, KG.

In 2019, Affable Media produced his video, Confessions of a Publisher: It Doesn't Have To Be Like This, But Somehow It Just Is.

In 2020, Unicorn published his spiritual abstract art book Truth and Beauty: The Art of Sophie Chang.

In 2021, Affable Media published his historical fiction title A Case of Royal Blackmail by Sherlock Holmes.

In 2022, he wrote and produced the short film Undead and Alive, a zombie/witch romcom.

Interests and hobbies 
An ex-Yachtmaster Instructor, Lord Strathcarron is an Honorary Life Member of the Royal Bombay Yacht Club, and a member of the Royal Cruising Club and the Royal Yacht Squadron.

In 2012, he qualified as a civil and commercial mediator with the Civil Mediation Council. In 2013, he qualified as a Restorative Justice practitioner, registered with the Restorative Justice Council. He is also the vice-chair and a trustee of The Society of Mediators.

Arms

See also
List of Royal Yacht Squadron members

References

External links
Ian Strathcarron
Hereditary Peerage Association
Grenoble University,
Strathcarron & Company,
Global Alliance Automotive Ltd,
Sophie Macpherson Ltd
RYA Training
Blog: Bryon's Grand Tour, Retoured
Charity Commission
Troubador Publishing
School of Economic Science
Rory Macpherson Studio
Civil Mediation Council

1949 births
Living people
People educated at Hill House School
Journalists from London
People educated at Eton College
Barons in the Peerage of the United Kingdom
Conservative Party (UK) hereditary peers
Hereditary peers elected under the House of Lords Act 1999